The 1983 season was the Hawthorn Football Club's 59th season in the Victorian Football League and 82nd overall. Hawthorn qualified for finals for the second consecutive season. Hawthorn qualified for their seventh Grand Final and their first since 1978. Hawthorn won their fifth premiership defeating  140–57 in the Grand Final. This was their first premiership since 1978.

Fixture

Premiership season

Finals series

Ladder

References

Hawthorn Football Club seasons